Esther David (born 17 March 1945) is an Indian Jewish author, an artist and a sculptor. She is a recipient of the Sahitya Akademi Award.

Early life
She was born into a Bene Israel Jewish family in Ahmedabad, Gujarat. She won Sahitya Akademi Award in 2010 for The Book of Rachel.

Her father, Reuben David, was a hunter-turned-veterinarian, who founded the Kamala Nehru Zoological Garden and Balvatika near Kankaria lake in Ahmedabad. Her mother, Sarah, was a school teacher.

After her schooling in Ahmedabad, She was at Maharaja Sayajirao University of Baroda, as a student of Fine Arts and Art History. There she met Sankho Chaudhary, a sculptor, who taught her sculpture and Art History. After her graduation she returned to Ahmedabad and started her career as a professor in art history and art appreciation. She taught at the Sheth Chimanlal Nagindas Fine Arts College, CEPT University and NIFT.

She started writing about art and became the Times of India art critic, a national English daily. Later she became a columnist for Femina, a women's magazine, the "Times of India" and other leading national dallies. She is an advisory editor of Eve Times, Ahmedabad. She has written several books. She had edited and contributed in some books also. Her books are related to Bene Israel Jews in Ahmedabad.

The Hadassah-Brandeis Institute (HBI) featured Shalom India Housing Society in the Hasassah-Brandeis 2010–2011 calendar, which highlights 12 Jewish women authors across the world whose "writing illuminates a particular city". The title of the calendar was Jewish Women Writers and the Cities that Influence Them.

Bibliography
 
 The Walled City 1997 East West Books, Madras. Re-published by Syracuse University Press USA.
 By the Sabarmati
The Book of Esther 
Book of Rachel 
My Father’s Zoo 2007   
Shalom India Housing Society 2007
One Church, One All Jewish Faith, One God 2008 Media Creations,Inc.
The Man with Enormous Wings 2010 Penguin Books
Bombay Brides 2019, Harpercollins 
Contributor
Sari Sutra, contributed a chapter on Bene Israeli Jewish costumes.
City Stories "The Worry Box and The Laughing Lady" Scholastic India.
Growing Up as a Woman Writer "Nanki Chirai"   Sahitya Academy New Delhi.
Gattu's Wildlife Adventures
Editor
Ane Dhara Dhruji

Awards and recognition
Writer in Residence at Villa Mont Noir, France in 1999–2000.
Writer in Residence, Maison des Écrivains Étrangers et des Traducteurs, Saint-Nazaire, France in 2001–2002.
Sahitya Akademi Award 2010 for The Book of Rachel.
Hadassah-Brandeis Institute (HBI) Research Award 2011 for "I am the seed of the Tree…," A Jewish woman’s search of her Jewish  heritage in India.
Hadassah-Brandeis Institute (HBI) Research Award 2016 for Bene-Appetite (Research on Indian Jewish Food Traditions).

See also
 List of Indian writers

References

Further reading
 Weil, Shalva. 2008 'Esther David: The Bene Israel Novelist who Grew Up with a Tiger' in David Shulman and Shalva Weil (eds) Karmic Passages: Israeli Scholarship on India,New Delhi: Oxford University Press, pp. 232–253.
 Weil, Shalva. 2009 'Bene Israel Rites and Routines' in Shalva Weil (ed.) India’s Jewish Heritage: Ritual, Art and Life-Cycle, Mumbai: Marg Publications [first published in 2002; 3rdedn.], 78–89. Reprinted in Marg: A Magazine of The Arts, 54(2): 26–37
 Weil, Shalva. 'Bene Israel'  in Judith Baskin (ed.) Cambridge Dictionary of Judaism and Jewish Culture, New York: Cambridge University Press.2011,pp 59.

External links
 

1945 births
20th-century Indian novelists
20th-century Indian women writers
Living people
Bene Israel
English-language writers from India
Gujarati-language writers
Gujarati people
Indian Jews
Indian women novelists
Jewish women writers
Maharaja Sayajirao University of Baroda alumni
Novelists from Gujarat
Recipients of the Sahitya Akademi Award in English
Women writers from Gujarat
Writers from Ahmedabad
Jewish women artists
Indian women sculptors
Jewish sculptors